Consulting Psychology Journal: Practice and Research is the flagship journal of the Society of Consulting Psychology, a division of the American Psychological Association. It is a peer-reviewed, scholarly journal that publishes quantitative and qualitative research, case studies, conceptual articles, and wisdom papers that advance the practice of providing psychologically-based services to improve organizations and the people who work in them.

The journal is applied in nature and publishes papers that meet scientific standards, but are also readable, practical, and actionable. The current editors are Robert B. Kaiser and Kenneth Nowack.

Special issues
The journal has published a number of special issues on important consulting psychology topics, such as More About Executive Coaching: Practice and Research, Emerging Issues in Leadership Development Consultation, Workplace Bullying/Mobbing, Culture, Race and Ethnicity in Organizational Consulting Psychology, and Organizational Consulting in National Security Contexts.

Abstracting and indexing
The journal is indexed by PsycINFO/PsychAbstracts and Scopus and is electronically accessible through PsycARTICLES.

References

External links

Organizational psychology journals
Publications established in 1949
American Psychological Association academic journals
English-language journals